The 2001 Minnesota Twins marked the beginning of the Twins' ascendancy in the American League Central Division.  After finishing the 2000 season last in the division with a disappointing 69-93 record, the 2001 team rebounded to finish 85–77, good enough for second place in the division. The six-year run of winning seasons that followed is the longest such stretch in franchise history.  In his last year as manager, Tom Kelly continued the development of a core of young players who would win their division the following year.

Third baseman Corey Koskie hit 26 home runs and stole 27 bases, the only Twins player to steal at least 25 bases and hit 25 home runs in the same season.

Regular season
After years of having only one All-Star representative, the 2001 Twins had three: Cristian Guzmán, Joe Mays, and Eric Milton.
The highest paid Twin in 2001 was Brad Radke at $7,750,000; followed by Todd Jones at $3,975,000.
Herb Carneal and Jim Kaat were inducted into the Minnesota Twins Hall of Fame.

Offense

The team had consistent starters, many of whom performed well.  First baseman Doug Mientkiewicz, who had a disappointing 1999 season and spent most of 2000 in the minors, had what seemed to be a breakout year, hitting .306 with 14 home runs and 74 RBI.  Second baseman Luis Rivas appeared to be on the verge of breaking out as well, hitting .266 but stealing a team-leading 31 bases.  Shortstop Cristian Guzmán built on his solid 2000 season by batting .302, stealing 25 bases, and once again leading the major leagues in triples with 14.  His numbers were solid enough to earn him his first and only all-star berth.  Third baseman Corey Koskie had his best year, hitting .276, with 26 home runs and 103 RBI.  Amazingly, he also stole 27 bases.  A. J. Pierzynski had a solid year for a catcher, batting .289 with 7 home runs.  The "Soul Patrol" outfield of Jacque Jones in left, Torii Hunter in center, and Matt Lawton in right continued to impress, although Lawton was traded midway through the season.  The biggest offensive question mark was the designated hitter position, with David Ortiz spending much of the year injured—as was often the case during his Twins tenure.  He started only 78 games as the DH, with Chad Allen starting 22 and Brian Buchanan 19.

Pitching

Brad Radke, Eric Milton, and Joe Mays capably filled the first three spots in the starting rotation throughout the year, with Milton and Mays earning all-star berths for their efforts.  The final two spots were question marks, with Kyle Lohse making 16 uninspired starts, and J. C. Romero 11.  (The team had still not figured out that Romero was better suited to the bullpen.)  Because of the weak back end of the rotation, the team traded Lawton for pitcher Rick Reed midway through the year.  Reed did not quite meet expectations, going 4-6 with a 5.19 ERA in twelve starts.

The bullpen was in flux.  LaTroy Hawkins struggled as the team's closer, leading to Eddie Guardado earning 12 saves.  Guardado, Jack Cressend, Todd Jones, and Mark Redman had serviceable years, but Bob Wells, Héctor Carrasco, and Juan Rincón did not.

Defense

Like most of Tom Kelly's teams, the defense was exceptional.  It was anchored by Mientkiewicz, who earned a Gold Glove award for his efforts.  Rivas and Guzman were an impressive double-play combination, while Koskie improved defensively.  After a season of uncertainty behind the plate in 2000, Pierzynski solidified the catcher position, backed up by Tom Prince.  The speedy "Soul Patrol" outfield of Jones, Hunter, and Lawton was fun to watch.  Lawton's departure left a void that Brian Buchanan would attempt to fill.  However, as the team fell out of contention, he would give way to the platoon of Bobby Kielty and Dustan Mohr, known by fans collectively as "Dusty Kielmohr."

Season standings

Record vs. opponents

Roster

Notable transactions
February 12: Mike Oquist was signed as a free agent.
March 28, 2001: Brandon Knight was returned (earlier rule 5 draft pick) by the Twins to the New York Yankees.
March 30: Signed pitcher Héctor Carrasco as a free agent.  (Carrasco had played for the Twins in 2000, but was traded to the Boston Red Sox in September.)  Carrasco was granted free agency on October 19.
April 13: Signed outfielder Quinton McCracken as a free agent.  On October 8, he was granted free agency.
May 30: Signed pitcher Tony Fiore as a free agent.
June 5: In the amateur draft, the Twins drafted catcher and Minnesota native Joe Mauer with the first pick.
July 28: Traded pitcher Mark Redman to the Detroit Tigers for pitcher Todd Jones.  On November 5, Jones was granted free agency.
July 30: Traded outfielder Matt Lawton to the New York Mets for pitcher Rick Reed.
September 21: Casey Blake selected by the Baltimore Orioles off waivers.  On October 8, the Twins re-acquired Blake off waivers from the Orioles.

Player stats

Batting

Starters by position
Note: Pos = Position; G = Games played; AB = At bats; H = Hits; Avg. = Batting average; HR = Home runs; RBI = Runs batted in

Other batters
Note: G = Games played; AB = At bats; H = Hits; Avg. = Batting average; HR = Home runs; RBI = Runs batted in

Pitching

Starting pitchers
Note: G = Games pitched; IP = Innings pitched; W = Wins; L = Losses; ERA = Earned run average; SO = Strikeouts

Other pitchers
Note: G = Games pitched; IP = Innings pitched; W = Wins; L = Losses; ERA = Earned run average; SO = Strikeouts

Relief pitchers
Note: G = Games pitched; W = Wins; L = Losses; SV = Saves; ERA = Earned run average; SO = Strikeouts

Other post-season awards
Calvin R. Griffith Award (Most Valuable Twin) – Doug Mientkiewicz
Joseph W. Haynes Award (Twins Pitcher of the Year) – Joe Mays
Bill Boni Award (Twins Outstanding Rookie) – Luis Rivas
Charles O. Johnson Award (Most Improved Twin) – Joe Mays
Dick Siebert Award (Upper Midwest Player of the Year) – Aaron Sele
The above awards are voted on by the Twin Cities chapter of the BBWAA
Carl R. Pohlad Award (Outstanding Community Service) – Corey Koskie
Sherry Robertson Award (Twins Outstanding Farm System Player) – Michael Cuddyer

Farm system 

LEAGUE CO-CHAMPIONS: New Britain

References

External links
Player stats from www.baseball-reference.com
Team info from www.baseball-almanac.com
Twins history since 2000, from www.mlb.com 
2001 Standings

Minnesota Twins seasons
Minnesota Twins
2001 in sports in Minnesota